Russell Brunell Trood (5 December 1948 – 9 January 2017) was a Liberal Party Senator for the state of Queensland, Australia. His surprise election as the third Liberal from Queensland in the 2004 Federal Election, along with 38 other Coalition Senators gave the federal government of John Howard a majority in the Senate and thus control of both houses of Parliament. He did not retain his seat in the 2010 Australian federal election. His term in the senate ended on 30 June 2011.

Education 
He was previously Associate Professor of International Relations in the Department of International Business and Asian Studies at Griffith University. He worked alongside the academic Colin Mackerras.

Dr Trood trained in law (the LLB) at the University of Sydney, had a master's degree in strategic studies from the University of Wales and a PhD in international relations from Dalhousie University, Canada.

Career 
Trood was Deputy Chair of the Senate Standing Committee on Foreign Affairs, Defence and Trade, a member of the Joint Standing Committee on Foreign Affairs, Defence and Trade, Senate Standing Committee on Legal and Constitutional Affairs and co-chair of the Joint Standing Committee for the Library.

Dr Trood was a member of the Foreign Affairs Council, the Board of the Australian Indonesia Institute, the Australian Committee of Pacific Economic Cooperation Council (AUSPECC).

He was the Director of the Centre for the Study of Australia-Asia relations (CSAAR) at Griffith University from 1991 to 2003. He was a member of the Australian Committee of the Council for Security Cooperation in the Asia-Pacific (CSCAP) and the Queensland Council of the Australian Institute of International Affairs.

He authored numerous articles and chapters in journals and books on security and foreign policy issues and was a frequent media commentator on these matters. His publications include: The Emerging Global Order: Australian Foreign Policy in the 21st Century (2008); Power Shift: Challenges for Australia in Northeast Asia (2004); Strategic Culture in the Asia-Pacific (2000); Bilateralism in a Multilateral Era (1997); The Asia-Australia Survey 1996–97 (1996); The Future Pacific Economic Order: Australia's Role (1993) and The Indian Ocean: Perspectives on a Strategic Arena (1985).

Post-career and later life 
In 2012, Trood became the United Nations Association of Australia (UNAA) National President replacing Professor Sen. Robert Hill AC.

In February 2016, Trood was diagnosed with an aggressive form of thyroid cancer. He died in January 2017.

References

1948 births
2017 deaths
Dalhousie University alumni
Alumni of the University of Wales
Members of the Australian Senate
Members of the Australian Senate for Queensland
Liberal Party of Australia members of the Parliament of Australia
21st-century Australian politicians
Deaths from thyroid cancer
Deaths from cancer in Queensland
National Library of Australia Council members